House Armed Services Subcommittee on Seapower and Projection Forces is a subcommittee of the House Armed Services Committee in the United States House of Representatives.

The Chair of the subcommittee is Democrat Joe Courtney of Connecticut, the Ranking Member of the subcommittee of Republican Rob Wittman of Virginia.

Jurisdiction
The Seapower and Projection Forces Subcommittee exercises oversight and legislative jurisdiction over the United States Navy, United States Marine Corps, Navy Reserve equipment, and maritime programs.

The subcommittee does not have jurisdiction over strategic weapons (weapons of mass destruction), space or NASA, special operations, and information technology programs.

Members, 117th Congress

Historical membership rosters

115th Congress

116th Congress

See also
United States Senate Armed Services Subcommittee on SeaPower

References

External links
House Armed Services Committee
Subcommittee page 

Armed Services Seapower and Expeditionary Forces